Chikkaiah Naicker College is a general degree college in Erode, Tamil Nadu. The college is affiliated with Bharathiar University. This college offers different courses in arts, commerce and science.

History 
Chikkaiah Naicker College was founded by Thiru.M.Chikkaiah Naicker, on 12 July 1954 under the able guidance of social reformer and philanthropist Thiru.E.V.Ramasamy alias "Periyar" along with many other philanthropists who generously donated, and appropriately named initially as "Mahajana College" affiliated to the University of Madras. Though the institution is a Government-aided one, it has been directly administered by the Government of Tamil Nadu for the past 17 years (since 1998) through the Regional Joint Director of Collegiate Education, Coimbatore Region and later by appointing him/her as the "Caretaker" for the past 13 years, as per the sec 30 of Tamil Nadu Private Colleges Regulation (TNPCR) Act, 1976.

Academics
Started humbly and exclusively for boys with a strength of 150 students then, it has grown in these sixty years into a co-educational institution, with a strength of 1200 students, offering undergraduates and postgraduate programmes, along with diploma and research programmes.

Accreditation
The college is  recognized by the University Grants Commission (UGC) and accredited by NACC with an A Grade

References

External links
Official Website

Educational institutions established in 1954
1954 establishments in Madras State
Colleges affiliated to Bharathiar University
Education in Erode
Academic institutions formerly affiliated with the University of Madras